Sialomucin core protein 24 also known as endolyn or CD164 (cluster of differentiation 164) is a protein that in humans is encoded by the CD164 gene. CD164 functions as a cell adhesion molecule.

Sialomucins are a heterogeneous group of secreted or membrane-associated mucins that appear to play two key but opposing roles in vivo: first as cytoprotective or antiadhesive agents, and second as adhesion receptors. CD164 is a type I integral transmembrane sialomucin that functions as an adhesion receptor.

References

Further reading

External links
 
 

00